McNair (formerly Vale) is an unincorporated community in Fayetteville Township, Washington County, Arkansas, United States. It is located within Fayetteville in the southwest part of town near Baum Stadium. McNair was primarily the location of the switching board off the main Frisco line to the Ozark and Cherokee Central branch which went to Tahlequah.

References

Unincorporated communities in Washington County, Arkansas
Unincorporated communities in Arkansas